Karla Avelar (born 1978) is a Salvadoran transgender rights activist. She is the Executive Director of Comcavis Trans,

Biography
She has received several death threats, and survived assassination attempts. The first assassination attempt to her life was in 1992, when she was just a teen, she was able to disarm her assailant who drew a .45 at Avelar.

Works
In 2008, Avelar founded the support organization for transgenders called COMCAVIS TRANS, it was founded as a response to the needs felt by TRANS women participating in the various support groups (people with HIV) to feel discriminated against, not represented and did not obtain the required information according to their own characteristics.

Awards
She was a finalist of the Martin Ennals Award for Human Rights Defenders in the year of 2017.

References

External links 

 Comcavis Trans website

1978 births
Living people